Eugénio Fernando Bila (born 3 March 1979), commonly known as Genito, is a Mozambican former footballer who played as a midfielder. He represented The Black Mambas at 2010 African Cup of Nations.

Honours 
Hungarian Cup
2007, 2009

External links 

1979 births
Living people
Sportspeople from Maputo
Mozambican footballers
Mozambique international footballers
2010 Africa Cup of Nations players
Mozambican expatriate footballers
Expatriate footballers in Hungary
Budapest Honvéd FC players
Mozambican expatriate sportspeople in Hungary
Expatriate footballers in Cyprus
Mozambican expatriate sportspeople in Cyprus
Nea Salamis Famagusta FC players
Liga Leumit players
Sektzia Ness Ziona F.C. players
Expatriate footballers in Israel
Mozambican expatriate sportspeople in Israel
C.D. Maxaquene players
Cypriot First Division players
Nemzeti Bajnokság I players
Moçambola players
Association football midfielders